Lightning Jack is a 1994 Western comedy film written by and starring Paul Hogan, as well as Cuba Gooding Jr. and Beverly D'Angelo.

Plot
Lightning Jack Kane, a long-sighted Australian outlaw in the American west, lives with his horse, Mate.  After the rest of his gang is killed in a robbery-gone-wrong, Jack survives only to read of the events in the newspaper that he was nothing next to others.  Annoyed at not being recognised as an outlaw, Jack attempts a robbery by himself, and ends up taking young mute Ben Doyle as a hostage. He later discovers that, tired of never having been treated with respect due to his disability and his race, Ben wishes to join him.

Jack attempts to teach Ben how to fire a gun and rob banks, with his first attempt at "on-the-job" training ending with Ben shooting himself in the foot. Across the course of the training, they pay occasional visits to saloons where Jack shows Ben the truth about adult life, including helping him to lose his virginity. However, the true nature of the saloon visits is for Jack to make contact with showgirl Lana Castel, who, unbeknownst to Jack, is madly in love with him.

When Ben's training is complete, the two learn of a bank which is said to have the entire town armed and ready to protect it. Jack sees this as the test he has been waiting for, and together they hatch a plan to rob it. Everything seems to be going smoothly and they are set to begin, until Jack discovers that a rival gang of outlaws is also planning to rob the bank. He is prepared to give up when Ben has a plan of his own.

Ben silently tips off the townspeople, who quickly swarm the bank with the rival outlaws inside. The gang is arrested and the entire town celebrates, allowing Jack and Ben to slip unnoticed into the bank and swiftly strip it clean. Before leaving, Jack jumps into the celebrations, ensuring that his grinning face is seen at the top of the town photo. By the time the true robbery is discovered, the two - and Lana - are gone, with a bounty of thousands on their heads and all of America searching for them - the life that Jack had always wanted.

Cast
 Paul Hogan as Jack "Lightning Jack" Kane
 Cuba Gooding Jr. as Ben Doyle
 Beverly D'Angelo as Lana Castel
 Kamala Lopez as Pilar
 Pat Hingle as U.S. Marshal Dan Kurtz
 L.Q. Jones as Sheriff Tom
 Richard Riehle as Marcus
 Frank McRae as Doyle
 Roger Daltrey as John T. Coles
 Max Cullen as Bart

Production 
Paul Hogan wanted to make a classic Western and he was attracted to the idea of making a movie about a bank robber.

Hogan created a company, Lightning Ridge Ltd, which he then floated on the Australian Stock Exchange to help fund the film through investors buying stock. Hogan raised funds this way in order to maintain creative control over the film. The company was delisted in 2001.

Filming took place in Santa Fe, NM; Tucson and Page, AZ; Moab, Utah; and Colorado with some interiors shot at Movie World Studios on the Gold Coast in Australia. Director Simon Wincer says making the film was a logistical nightmare because there were so many other westerns filming on the same locations at the same time, such as Wyatt Earp, Geronimo, City Slickers 2 and Tombstone.

Major League Baseball pitcher Roger Clemens makes an uncredited cameo appearance as the eye-patched outlaw character "Dutch Spencer".

Reception
Lightning Jack got negative reviews from critics. On Rotten Tomatoes the film has an approval rating of 6% based on reviews from 17 critics.

Box office
The film opened at number 2 in the United States behind Guarding Tess and grossed less than $17 million in the United States and Canada. It grossed A$6.4 million in Australia and $25 million worldwide.

Year-end lists 
 Top 18 worst (alphabetically listed, not ranked) – Michael Mills, The Palm Beach Post
 Dishonorable mention – Glenn Lovell, San Jose Mercury News
 Dishonorable mention – Dan Craft, The Pantagraph

References

External links 
 
 
 Lightning Jack at Oz Movies

1994 films
Australian Western (genre) comedy films
American Western (genre) comedy films
1990s English-language films
Films directed by Simon Wincer
Village Roadshow Pictures films
Savoy Pictures films
1990s adventure films
Films shot in Utah
Films shot in Arizona
Films shot in Colorado
Films shot in New Mexico
Films shot in Australia
1990s Western (genre) comedy films
1994 comedy films
1990s American films